Lawrence Johnson (born May 7, 1974) is an American pole vaulter, born in Norfolk, Virginia. He earned the nickname "LoJo" at the University of Tennessee where he won four NCAA titles in the pole vault.  LoJo began pole vaulting in 1989 and since has/holds records on all stages and led the charge to return the US to the international medal podium with two Olympic appearances, including a silver medal performance in 2000 Olympic games Sydney.

Lawrence resigned as Assistant Coach/Pole Vault at the University of South Carolina in August 2011 to start an online business.

Lawrence is best known for winning the Olympic silver medal in 2000, he also won a gold medal at the 2001 IAAF World Indoor Championships and a silver medal at the 1997 IAAF World Indoor Championships (First American to bring back a medal in the pole vault in a major competition since 1987). He is the current American Indoor Record Holder at 5.96m (19' - 6.5") set March 3, 2001].  His personal best jump is 5.98m (19' - 7.5"), which he achieved in 1996.

LoJo is one of the USA's most decorated pole vaulters.  His accomplishments include 2x HS National Champion, 7x SEC Champion, 4x NCAA Champion, 7x US Champion, World Champion, & Olympic SIlver Medallist. He still holds many stadium and meet records, as well as Collegiate Records. 

LoJo is also the first black pole vaulter to medal and step on the podium, which he achieved at the 2000 Olympic games.  He is the first black pole vaulter to win in a major competition (won silver in Paris in 1997), and the first black pole vaulter to make the Olympic Team in the Pole Vault, which he achieved at the 1996 Olympic Trials.

Achievements

References

External links
 Team VA website.  This website is about how to join the track and field team as well as team member info and results
 Vault Assault Online website.  This website is for training information and support
 LoJo Vault Assault website.  This website is for his vault club, camps, and clinics
 LoJo Entertainment website
 University of South Carolina profile of Lawrence Johnson

 USA Track and Field profile

1974 births
Living people
American male pole vaulters
Athletes (track and field) at the 1996 Summer Olympics
Athletes (track and field) at the 2000 Summer Olympics
Olympic silver medalists for the United States in track and field
Sportspeople from Norfolk, Virginia
Medalists at the 2000 Summer Olympics
Tennessee Volunteers men's track and field athletes
Track and field athletes from Virginia
Universiade medalists in athletics (track and field)
Universiade silver medalists for the United States
World Athletics Indoor Championships winners